Norwegian Viva is a Project Leonardo-class cruise ship under construction for Norwegian Cruise Line. She is the second out of six Project Leonardo-class ships in the Norwegian Cruise Line fleet. She is expected to enter service in mid-2023.

History 
Norwegian Cruise Line ordered four ships under Project Leonardo in February 2017, which included Norwegian Viva.

References

External links 

Ships of Norwegian Cruise Line